Harold Gwyer Garnett (19 November 1879 – 3 December 1917) was an English-born first-class cricketer who played for Lancashire County Cricket Club and Argentina. He was killed during World War I in the fighting at Cambrai, France. A wicketkeeper, in 152 first-class games he scored 5,798 runs and made 203 dismissals.

References

1879 births
1917 deaths
Argentine cricketers
Lancashire cricketers
English cricketers
Gentlemen cricketers
Cricketers from Liverpool
British military personnel killed in World War I
Wicket-keepers
English expatriate sportspeople in Argentina